Penn is a 1991 Indian drama anthology mini-series directed by Suhasini Maniratnam and produced by Charuhasan. The series on Madras Doordarshan featured eight standalone episodes examining the lives of South Indian women. Actresses Revathi, Bhanupriya, Geetha, Raadhika, Amala, Shobana, Saranya and Suhasini herself play the lead roles in the eight episodes, with an ensemble set of other actors in supporting roles. The series has music composed by Ilaiyaraaja, cinematography by G. P. Krishna and editing by B. Lenin and Gopal. The series was released in 1991.

Cast 

Hemavukku Kalyanam
Revathi as Hema
Charuhasan as Hema's father
Srividya as Hema's mother
Nithya as Hema's sister
Baby Raasi as the young version of Hema
Baby Neena as the young version of Hema's sister

Appa Appadithan
Gemini Ganesan as Sharada's father
Bhanupriya as Sharada
Bhanu Chander as Chandrasekhar
Rajyalakshmi as Sujatha
A. V. Ramanan as Chandrasekhar's brother
Lakshmipriya as Sharada's mother
Mythili as Chandrasekar's sister-in-law
Priya as Priya

Appa Irukken
Geetha
Chandrahasan
A. V. Ramanan
Kakinada Shyamala
Devika Rani
Geetha Nagarajan
Meena
Vikram Raj

Mrs Ranganath
Raadhika
Sarath Babu
Master Richard
Baby Divya
Susheela Ranganath
Veeraraghavan
Raghavendar
Veerasamy
Balaji
Krishnan

Kutty Anand
Amala
Nizhalgal Ravi
Master Anand
Kutty Padmini
Poornam Viswanathan
Vani
Gayathri

Love Story
Shobana
Nithya
Priya
Radhabhai
Raja
Venky

Raji Maathiri Ponnu
Sowcar Janaki
Raghuvaran
Saranya

Vaarthai Thavari Vittai
Parthiban
Suhasini Maniratnam

Episodes

Production 
Suhasini Maniratnam made her debut as a director through Penn, a mini-series with standalone episodes focusing on the lives of South Indian women.

V. Priya, who later moved on to work as a film writer and director, made her debut as an actress through the series. She noted she was inspired by Suhasini's style of film-making and the process inspired her to take up a career in the film industry.

References 

Indian television series
1990s Tamil-language television series debuts
1990s Tamil-language television series
Tamil-language television shows